Alwand Dam is a dam located on the Alwand River, southeast of Khanaqin,  from the Iraqi-Iranian border.

History 
At the beginning of 2013, the dam began operating. The importance of the dam lies in protecting Khanaqin from floods and torrential rains that come from the upper river. The dam's water is used in agricultural projects, drinking water and liquefaction, especially in the summer, and the surplus is drained to the Hemrin Dam. The foundation stone for the dam was laid in 2010, and the General Rafidain Company constructed the dam. The dam was opened in 2013, and its cost exceeded 28 billion dinars.

Dam Collapse 
Many rumors appeared at the end of 2014 after an earthquake occurred in the area, the most prominent of which was the collapse of the dam, which prompted the people to head to higher areas to escape from drowning, but it became clear later that the was nothing but a rumor.

References 

Water supply and sanitation in Iraq
Dams in Iraq
Diyala Governorate
Dams completed in 2013